Şehitlik station is a railway station in Adana, located in the Yeşiloba mahalle of the Seyhan district. It is the closest railway station to the Central Coach Terminal at 1.5 km distance. Yeşiloba horse-racing venue is 1.6 km. west of the station.

Images

External links
Şehitlik Gar - Train Schedule

References

Railway stations in Adana Province
Transport in Adana